MedicineNet is an American medical website that provides detailed information about diseases, conditions, medications and general health.

Launch of website
The website MedicineNet.com was launched in 1995.

Personnel
William Shiel co-founded MedicineNet and continues today as the Chief Medical Editor.

Melissa Stöppler also serves on the MedicineNet Editorial Board

Stoppler and Shiel were co editors-in-chief of Webster's New World Medical Dictionary, Year 2008, Third Edition.

Ownership
MedicineNet is an owned and operated site in the WebMD Consumer Network, and was acquired by WebMD in December 2004.

Purpose
MedicineNet is a network of U.S. Board-Certified Physicians and Allied Health Professionals working together to provide the public with current, comprehensive medical information, written in easy to understand language.

Privacy policy and certification
MedicineNet, as part of the WebMD Consumer Network, adheres to the same privacy policy as WebMD.com, and is certified by the TRUSTe online privacy certification program.

In addition, MedicineNet is HONcode certified to be in compliance with the Health on the Net health website principles.

Internet Traffic
MedicineNet is ranked No. 5 in the July 2017 eBizMBA Top 15 Most Popular Health Websites.

References

External links
 top health Medicine   (Tophealthmedicine website)

American medical websites
Internet properties established in 1996
1996 establishments in the United States